The Canadian Grain Elevator Discovery Centre is a set of restored grain elevators located in Nanton, Alberta, Canada. The centre's goal is to preserve examples of old grain elevators to educate visitors about the town's, and Alberta's,  agricultural history.

History

In 2001 the last of Nanton's grain elevator row was threatened by demolition because of recent abandonment and track removal (2002) by the Canadian Pacific Railway (MacLeod subdivision) that the elevators stood next to. Many worried citizens in and around the town of Nanton had realized that a part of the town's identity and province's history was about to be torn down and lost forever.

The north most elevators are twinned and ended their lives under the Alberta Wheat Pool colours.  Built in 1927 and decommissioned in 2000, these elevators show the traditional arrangement of office building separated from driveway and elevator by a raised access platform.  The south most elevator, built in 1929 has a balloon annex attached (1956) and was extensively remodeled in 1981.   

The concerned citizens of Nanton had rallied together and formed a Historical Society appropriately named "Save One". Of course the original goal of the save one effort was to do just that, save one, but before anything could be done to save the elevator the Society had to gain full title to the land and buildings. Which was a big undertaking that would take three years to achieve. With so many volunteer hours from many local businesses and citizens, the Society was so successful that not only did they end up saving just one elevator, but all three remaining elevators. Many donations from members and surrounding farmers-ranchers, have been made and have helped in replacing the railway tracks next to the elevators the completion of many of the repairs and restorations that needed to be done on the elevators. Including painting the former Alberta Wheat Pool back to its original green and the former Pioneer elevator back to the original orange & yellow.

Included in the row, but not a part of the Elevator Discovery Centre is the Nanton Seed Cleaning Co. elevator which is a smaller elevator.

2022 saw the site finally achieve provincial heritage designation status and the Canadian Grain Elevator Discovery Centre society is working diligently to restore and renovate the site.

See also
 List of grain elevators
 List of museums in Alberta

References

External links
 Canadian Grain Elevator Discovery Center

Grain elevator museums in Alberta
Open-air museums in Canada